Tom Clancy's Splinter Cell is a 2002 stealth video game developed by Ubi Soft Montreal and published by Ubi Soft. It is the first game in the Splinter Cell series. Endorsed by author Tom Clancy, it follows the activities of NSA black ops agent Sam Fisher (voiced by Michael Ironside). The game was inspired by both the Metal Gear series and games created by Looking Glass Studios, and was built using Unreal Engine 2.

Originally released as an Xbox exclusive in 2002, the game was ported to Microsoft Windows, PlayStation 2, GameCube and Mac OS X in 2003. A side-scrolling adaptation developed by Gameloft was also released in 2003 for Game Boy Advance, mobile phones and N-Gage (the latter with the subtitle Team Stealth Action). A remastered high definition version was released on PlayStation 3 in September 2011, and an Xbox version was made available for Xbox One via backward compatibility in June 2019.

Splinter Cell received critical acclaim on release and is considered as one of the best video games ever made. The success of the game lead to multiple sequels, starting with Pandora Tomorrow in 2004, and a series of novels written under the pseudonym David Michaels. A remake of Splinter Cell is currently in development by Ubisoft Toronto.

Gameplay 
The primary focus and hallmark of Splinter Cells gameplay is stealth, with strong emphasis on light and darkness. The player is encouraged to move through the shadows for concealment whenever possible. The game displays a "light meter" that reflects how visible the player character is to enemies, and night vision and thermal vision goggles to help the player navigate in darkness or smoke/fog, respectively. The light meter functions even when night vision goggles is activated, and it is possible to destroy lights, thus reducing the chances of exposure significantly.

Splinter Cell strongly encourages the use of stealth over brute force. Although Sam Fisher is usually equipped with firearms, he carries limited ammunition and is not frequently provided with access to additional ammo. The player begins most missions with a limited supply of less-than-lethal weapons in addition to Fisher's firearms, a suppressed FN Five-Seven sidearm that is provided for every mission, as well as a suppressed FN F2000 assault rifle during some missions, which includes a telescopic sight and a launcher for some of the less-lethal devices such as ring airfoil projectiles, "sticky shockers" and CS gas grenades. The weapon can even fire a camera that sticks onto surfaces, allowing Fisher to covertly perform surveillance from a safe area.

Flexibility of movement is a focuspoint of Splinter Cell. Fisher can sneak up on enemies from behind to grab them; allowing interrogation, quiet incapacitation, or use as a human shield. Fisher is acrobatic and physically adept, and has a variety of maneuvers including the ability to mantle onto and climb along ledges, hang from pipes and perform a "split jump" in narrow spaces to mantle up a steep wall.

Plot 
In August 2004, former U.S. Navy SEAL officer Sam Fisher joins the National Security Agency, as part of its newly formed division "Third Echelon" headed by his old friend Irving Lambert. Two months later, Fisher, aided by technical expert Anna "Grim" Grimsdóttír and field runner Vernon Wilkes Jr., is sent to Georgia to investigate the disappearance of two CIA officersAlice Madison, who had been installed in the new government of Georgian president Kombayn Nikoladze, who seized power in a bloodless coup d'état following the assassination of his predecessor earlier in the year; and Robert Blaustein, who was sent in to find her. Fisher discovers both were murdered on Nikoladze's orders by former Spetsnaz member Vyacheslav Grinko. Further investigation soon reveals that the CIA agents had discovered that Nikoladze is waging an ethnic cleansing campaign across Azerbaijan with Georgian commandos. In retaliation, NATO forces enter Azerbaijan, prompting Nikoladze to go underground.

Third Echelon soon discovers a data exchange is taking place between a Caspian oil rig and the Georgian presidential palace, and assign Fisher to recover the data. Narrowly avoiding an airstrike by NATO, Fisher recovers a technician's laptop with files on an item called "The Ark", as well as evidence that there is a mole in the CIA. Shortly after this, North America is hit by a massive cyber warfare attack directed at military targets, to which Nikoladze claims responsibility before declaring war on the United States and its allies. Investigating the leak, Fisher discovers a back-up of data by a staff member to an unsecured laptop that was exploited by a Virginian-based network owned by Kalinatek, Inc. After Grim's efforts spook the Georgians, Fisher is sent to the company's Virginia offices to recover an encryption key from Ivan, a technician in the building, as Georgian-hired mafiosos attempt to liquidate all the incriminating evidence. In his escape, Wilkes is mortally wounded extracting him and dies soon afterwards.

With the encryption key, the NSA discover that Nikoladze has been using a network of unconventional relays to communicate with Georgian military cells. Tracing the full relay network back to the Chinese embassy in Yangon, Myanmar, Fisher is sent in discreetly to investigate. Fisher discovers from captured U.S. soldiers and high-ranking Chinese diplomats that Nikoladze is working alongside a rogue collective of Chinese soldiers led by General Kong Feirong, after rescuing them from being executed on a live web broadcast. After killing Grinko in a firefight when he attempts to kill the Americans and Chinese, Fisher moves to capture Feirong for information on Nikoladze's location. After preventing him from committing suicide in a drunken stupor, Feirong reveals that Nikoladze had fled back to Georgia in order to activate a device codenamed "The Ark".

Infiltrating the Georgian presidential palace where Nikoladze and new Georgian president Varlam Cristavi are, Fisher attempts to recover the key to the Ark, which he learns is in fact a nuclear suitcase bomb that has been placed somewhere in the United States. Fisher corners Nikoladze, who bargains to give the Ark key in exchange for safe passage out of Georgia. After Cristavi's forces arrive and escort Nikoladze to safety, Lambert rescues Fisher from execution by creating a diversion via power blackout. Discovering that Nikoladze is offering the Ark's location for protection, Fisher assassinates him. The National Guard eventually locates the bomb and evacuates an apartment complex in Hope's Gate, Maryland under the pretense of a gas leak before secretly recovering the weapon. Despite a war being averted, Nikoladze's corpse sparks international backlash due to the suspicious circumstances around his death. Watching the U.S. president give a speech on the end of the crisis, Fisher then receives a secure phone call from Lambert for another assignment.

Development 
The game originally started development as a sci-fi, James Bond type game called The Drift, which Ubisoft intended to be "a Metal Gear Solid 2 killer". The game's producer Mathieu Ferland said "Metal Gear Solid was a huge inspiration for Splinter Cell." The game's designer and writer Clint Hocking also said Splinter Cell "owes its existence to" the Metal Gear series, while noting he was also influenced by System Shock, Thief and Deus Ex.

Because the development team was aiming for a Teen ESRB rating, the team tried to minimize the level of violence. The soundtrack for the game was composed by English composer Michael Richard Plowman.

Version differences 
The PC version of Tom Clancy's Splinter Cell is fairly closely based on the original Xbox version. Both were made by Ubisoft Montreal. The GameCube and PlayStation 2 versions, released later, were developed by Ubisoft Shanghai and are similar to each other, but have many small changes over the originals with the result that they are generally easier. Some doors are moved around, guards are less likely to notice gunshots, etc.

Each version of the game has some exclusive features. The Xbox and Windows versions have three new downloadable missions which involve a Russian nuclear sub. The PlayStation 2 version includes an exclusive level between Kalinatek and the Chinese Embassy which takes place in a nuclear power plant in the Kola Peninsula, new cinematics, a new intro cinematic with original music by the Prague Orchestra and many behind-the-scenes interviews and documentaries both about the new intro and the game itself. The GameCube version includes the same cinematics, uses the Game Boy Advance link cable to give players a real-time overhead map, a new sticky-bomb weapon and progressive scan (480p) support. Additionally, both the GameCube and PlayStation 2 versions include new binoculars items. The Windows versions also includes support for the EAX 3.0 ADVANCED HD 3D positional audio technology by Creative Labs, which available in the EMU10K2 processor-based Soundcard such as the Sound Blaster Audigy and Audigy 2 series.

A PlayStation 3 version was announced to be part of the Splinter Cell Trilogy which was released in September 2011 as part of Sony's Classics HD series. It was revealed on the PlayStation Blog that it would be ported from the PC version, because it had more details and more content than the PlayStation 2 version. It was released on the European PlayStation Network on August 10, 2011. The PlayStation 3 version does not include the downloadable bonus missions that the Xbox and PC versions had.

Reception 

Tom Clancy's Splinter Cell received positive reviews upon the game's release. GameSpot's Greg Kasavin said that Splinter Cell has "hands down the best lighting effects seen in any game to date." GameSpot later named Splinter Cell the second-best Xbox game of November 2002, behind MechAssault. IGN likewise praised the game for its graphics and lighting, while also praising how it evolved Metal Gear Solids third-person stealth-action gameplay. Both praised the game's audio, noting that Michael Ironside as Sam Fisher's voice suited the role perfectly. Scott Alan Marriott of AllGame gave the Xbox version four-and-a-half stars out of five and called it "one of the few games to elicit a feeling of suspense without resorting to shock techniques found in survival horror titles like Resident Evil."

Criticism of the game was also present. Greg Kasavin said that Splinter Cell is "sometimes reduced to frustrating bouts of trial and error." In addition, Kasavin criticized the game's cutscenes, saying that they are not up to par with the rest of the game's graphics.

Non video-game publications also gave the game favorable reviews. Entertainment Weekly gave the Xbox version an A and called it "wickedly ingenious". The Village Voice gave the PlayStation 2 version eight out of ten and said, "If this game were any more realistic, you'd have to hold in your farts." The Cincinnati Enquirer gave the Game Boy Advance version all four stars and said that "While it lacks 3-D graphics and an impressive use of lighting and shadows found in its predecessors, the stealthy action game still captures the thrill of modern espionage."

Sales 
Tom Clancy's Splinter Cell was a commercial success. Pre-orders reached 1.1 million units and the game sold 480,000 copies worldwide by the end of 2002, after three weeks on sale. France accounted for 60,000 units in the initial three weeks. By early January 2003, sales in North America had surpassed 1 million units, while Europe accounted for 600,000 units. By March 31, 2003, its sales had risen to 3.6 million copies. Splinter Cell sold 4.5 million copies by June and 5 million by the end of September, and its sales reached 6 million units by the end of March 2004. By July 2006, the Xbox version of Splinter Cell had sold 2.4 million copies and earned $62 million in the United States alone. Next Generation ranked it as the 10th highest-selling game launched for the PlayStation 2, Xbox or GameCube between January 2000 and July 2006 in that country. It remained the best-selling Splinter Cell game in the United States by July 2006.

The game's PlayStation 2 and Xbox versions each received a "Platinum" sales award from the Entertainment and Leisure Software Publishers Association (ELSPA), given to titles that sell at least 300,000 copies in the United Kingdom. Splinter Cells computer version received a "Silver" sales award from ELSPA, indicating sales of at least 100,000 copies in the United Kingdom.

Awards 
E3 2002 Game Critics Awards: Best Action/Adventure Game
3rd Annual Game Developers Choice Awards: Excellence in Writing
6th Annual Interactive Achievement Awards: Console Game of the Year, Outstanding Achievement in Game Play Engineering
IGN Best of 2002: Xbox Game of the Year, Xbox Best Graphics
2003 Spike Video Game Awards: Best Handheld Game,

Splinter Cell was a runner-up for Computer Games Magazines list of the 10 best games of 2003. It won GameSpots 2002 "Best Graphics (Technical)" and "Best Action Adventure Game" awards among Xbox games, and was nominated in the "Best Sound", "Best Graphics (Artistic)" and overall "Game of the Year on Xbox" categories.

Nominations 
3rd Annual Game Developers Choice Awards: Game of the Year, Original Game Character of the Year, Excellence in Game Design, Excellence in Level Design, and Excellence in Programming
6th Annual Interactive Achievement Awards: Innovation in Console Gaming, Outstanding Achievement in Sound Design, Outstanding Achievement in Visual Engineering, and Console Action/Adventure Game of the Year
IGN Best of 2002: Overall Game of the Year

Remake 
On December 15, 2021, Ubisoft announced that a remake of the game is under development at Ubisoft Toronto using Snowdrop, the game engine behind Tom Clancy's The Division and Avatar: Frontiers of Pandora.

Notes

References

External links 

Official website via Internet Archive

2002 video games
Action-adventure games
Game Boy Advance games
Interactive Achievement Award winners
MacOS games
Mobile games
N-Gage games
GameCube games
Fiction about the People's Liberation Army
PlayStation 2 games
PlayStation 3 games
 01
Stealth video games
Tom Clancy games
Ubisoft games
Video games developed in Canada
Video games developed in France
Video games developed in China
Video games set in 2004
Video games set in 2005
Video games set in Azerbaijan
Video games set in Georgia (country)
Video games set in Russia
Video games set in Myanmar
Video games set in Virginia
Works about Chinese military personnel
Windows games
Xbox games
Video games with alternative versions
Gameloft games
Single-player video games
Aspyr games
Games with GameCube-GBA connectivity

de:Tom Clancy’s Splinter Cell#Splinter Cell
hr:Tom Clancy's Splinter Cell#Splinter Cell